The 1979 Family Circle Cup was a women's tennis tournament played on outdoor clay courts at the Sea Pines Plantation on Hilton Head Island, South Carolina in the United States. The event was part of the AAAA category of the 1979 Colgate Series.  It was the seventh edition of the tournament and was held from April 10 through April 15, 1979. Second-seeded Tracy Austin won the singles title and earned $30,000 first-prize money.

Finals

Singles
 Tracy Austin defeated  Kerry Reid 7–6(7–3), 7–6(9–7)
 It was Austin's 2nd title of the year and the 5th of her career.

Doubles
 Rosie Casals /  Martina Navratilova defeated  Françoise Dürr /  Betty Stöve 6–4, 7–5

Prize money

Notes

References

External links
 Women's Tennis Association (WTA) tournament edition details
 International Tennis Federation (ITF) tournament edition details

Family Circle Cup
Family Circle Cup
Charleston Open
Family Circle Cup
Family Circle Cup